Mathías Adalberto Villasanti Rolón (born 24 January 1997) is a Paraguayan professional footballer who plays as midfielder for Campeonato Brasileiro Série A club Grêmio and the Paraguay national team.

Club career
Mathías made 36 league appearances including 31 starts in the 2019 season,  in the same season he also featured in the Copa Libertadores on ten occasions.  “The Copa taught me some great lessons and made me a better player. The game against Mineiro, in truth, was one of the most beautiful things in the tournament because with the push of our fans we added goals in the blink of an eye.”

Grêmio
On 12 August 2021 Grêmio officially announced the signing of Villasanti from Cerro Porteño on a US$3,3m transfer fee, with a contract running until December 2024.

International
Villasanti made his senior national team debut on 10 October 2019 in a friendly against Serbia.

Honours
Grêmio
Campeonato Gaúcho: 2022
Recopa Gaúcha: 2022

References

1997 births
Living people
Paraguayan footballers
Association football midfielders
Paraguay under-20 international footballers
Paraguay international footballers
2021 Copa América players
Paraguayan Primera División players
Campeonato Brasileiro Série A players
Campeonato Brasileiro Série B players
Cerro Porteño players
Grêmio Foot-Ball Porto Alegrense players
Paraguayan expatriate footballers
Paraguayan expatriate sportspeople in Argentina
Paraguayan expatriate sportspeople in Brazil
Expatriate footballers in Argentina
Expatriate footballers in Brazil